Squeeze is the fifth and final studio album released under The Velvet Underground band name, recorded in the autumn of 1971 and released in Feb 1973 by Polydor Records. The album features no members of the Lou Reed-era group other than multi-instrumentalist Doug Yule, who wrote and recorded the album almost entirely by himself. Yule had joined the Velvet Underground (replacing founding member John Cale,) in October 1968, prior to the band recording their self-titled third album, and Yule had also contributed significantly to the fourth album, Loaded. Following the departures of the remaining founding members (Reed and Sterling Morrison), Yule was positioned as the de facto leader of the band. Longtime drummer Maureen Tucker was slated to appear on Squeeze by Yule, but she was dismissed by the band's manager, Steve Sesnick.

Following a brief promotional tour for the album by Yule and a backing band, Yule called it quits, bringing the Velvet Underground to an end. The lineup from the first two albums—sans the late Nico—would eventually reform without Yule for a tour in 1993 (Yule was also not included in the 1996 Rock and Roll Hall of Fame induction of the Velvet Underground). Squeeze failed to chart and quickly fell into obscurity after its release. Critics generally dismiss the record as "a Velvet Underground album in name only".

Composition and recording
Following the departure of guitarist Sterling Morrison in Aug. 1971, the final Velvet Underground lineup consisted of Doug Yule (vocals, guitar), Willie Alexander (keyboards, vocals), Walter Powers (bass guitar) and Maureen Tucker (drums). This version of the band had toured the United Kingdom and the Netherlands in October and November 1971 to support its latest album, Loaded, which had been written and recorded when Lou Reed was in the band, and which had seen a European release in March 1971. The plan was to record a second and final album for their record company, Atlantic Records, afterwards, but Atlantic lost faith and decided to issue an archive audience recording from 1970 featuring Lou Reed, Live at Max's Kansas City, instead.

After the tour, band manager Steve Sesnick managed to get a recording deal with Polydor UK to record a final Velvet Underground album. Alexander, Powers and Tucker were sent back to the United States by Sesnick, however, presumably for him to retain maximum control over the finished product. Thus, although Squeeze was released nominally as a Velvet Underground album, Yule was the only Velvet to actually perform on it. Yule later said, "I don't think Moe [Tucker] would have been expensive in money, but too costly in terms of 'management', meaning that she didn't take a lot of bullshit and would have taken a lot of 'handling' on Sesnick's part." Yule also recalled that the album "was done with just me. All the basic tracks were laid down with drums and me. Ian Paice of Deep Purple played the drums. So he and I would lay down a track. How much interplay can you have when all it is one guitar or a piano? You can hear that, it's kind of dead. I think you get more when you have 3 or 4 people playing together, they feed off each other, they work together and something comes out of it, it's bigger." Yule's and Paice's performances were augmented with occasional saxophone and backing vocals.

The eleven songs that make up Squeeze were written by Yule and  range from Beatles-like whimsy ("Crash") via pop to typical 1970s rock ("Mean Old Man"). Yule later recalled, "I remember sitting on a plane writing extensive notes on the mixing of the album. I sent it to Steve and none of my suggestions were taken, I'm sure he didn't even read it. He mixed it for the best possible commercial success. (...) It's really embarrassing. I gave what I had at the time. There are parts of it I hate and parts I don't. But if I had to do it over again, it would be a completely different album, with different people and have nothing to do with Sesnick."

Release and reception

Squeeze was recorded in the autumn of 1972 and released in the United Kingdom, France, Germany (all 1973), Spain (1974), and Japan (year unknown). No singles were taken off it and the album did not chart. Yule assembled a backing band consisting of Rob Norris (guitar), George Kay (bass guitar) and Mark Nauseef (drums) to tour the United Kingdom in November and December 1972 to promote the upcoming album; a live recording from this tour is included on the 2001 live box set Final V.U. 1971–1973. After the tour, during which they were deserted by Sesnick, Yule also called it quits, bringing the Velvet Underground to an end.

Squeeze saw a number of re-issues in France during the 1970s and early 1980s. It went out of print afterwards, until it received a compact disc and new LP release in 2012 by Kismet Records (see below). The status of Squeeze in the Velvet Underground's recorded canon was generally regarded as dubious well into the 1990s. In the mid-1970s, the NME Book of Rock counted it as "a Velvet Underground album in name only". The 1995 CD boxed set Peel Slowly and See includes the four studio albums from the Lou Reed era of the band, but excludes Squeeze.  In the liner notes, David Fricke didn't offer any analysis of the album, and dismissed it as "an embarrassment to the VU discography".  AllMusic's Stephen Thomas Erlewine says "it doesn't just ride the coattails of VU's legacy but deliberately co-opts their achievement – but it's listenable, something its reputation never suggests". In March 2012, Classic Rock included the album at 28 in their list of The 50 Worst Albums of All Time.

In recent years however, the album has been revisited by both critics and musicians with more sympathetic and favorable reviews.  In 2011 music writer Steven Shehori included Squeeze in his "Criminally Overlooked Albums" series for The Huffington Post, and in a lengthy review of the album, offered the following positive assessment of Squeeze: "if you pluck it from the shackles of its murky back-story, Squeeze is nothing short of a quintessential listening experience." The UK band Squeeze took their name from its title according to band member Chris Difford, who also offered the following opinion of the album in a 2012 interview: "It's an odd record, but the name came from that, definitely. […] In a retrospective way I really enjoy it. It has kind of a naivety about it". In 1995, Doug Yule described the recording of Squeeze being "like the blind leading the blind, me leading myself. That's what came out of it, I don't even have a copy of it. But it's kind of a nice memory for me and kind of an embarrassment at the same time. I wish I had my eyes wider open, but it was nice to get my name and my songs out there."

The song "Friends" was included by the indie rock band Luna on their covers album "A Sentimental Education" which was released in September 2017.

CD release

In 2012, Squeeze received both a CD release and a new LP release from Kismet Records, a label that specializes in reissuing obscure albums by relatively unknown acts. On the CD, a slight amount of white noise can be heard throughout, indicating that it was recorded directly from an LP copy of the album. The reissues do not appear to be officially licensed from Polydor. A disclaimer included with the release states:

An e-mail address is then provided for the owner(s) of the music to contact Kismet for payment of royalties.

The reissues contain no outtakes. The packages do feature a short article from Melody Maker written by Richard Williams, originally published on 6 October 1971. The article features brief comments from Yule about the then-current UK tour that he was completing with original Velvet drummer Maureen Tucker and recently added members Walter Powers and William Alexander.

Track listing

Personnel
Doug Yule – lead vocals, guitars, keyboards, bass guitar, producer

Additional musicians
"Malcolm" – saxophone
Ian Paice – drums, possible percussion
Unidentified female backing vocals

References

External links
Velvet Underground Squeeze, archived version of a fansite devoted to the album.
Foggy Notion, waybacked version of a fansite; contains two articles about the post-Reed VU.

1973 albums
Albums produced by Doug Yule
Polydor Records albums
The Velvet Underground albums